List of Ministers of the Interior of Senegal:

 Valdiodio Ndiaye
 Mamadou Dia
 Ousmane Alioune Sylla
 Doudou Thiam
 Abdoulaye Fofana
 Amadou Cissé Dia
 Amadou Clédor Sall
 Jean Collin
 Médoune Fall
 Ibrahima Wone
 Jean Collin
 André Sonko
 Famara Ibrahima Sagna
 Madieng Khary Dieng
 Djibo Leyti Kâ
 Abdourahmane Sow
 Lamine Cissé
 Mamadou Niang
 Macky Sall
 Cheikh Saadibou Fall
 Ousmane Ngom
 Cheikh Tidiane Sy
 Bécaye Diop 
 Mbaye Ndiaye 
 Général Pathé Seck 
 Abdoulaye Daouda Diallo
 Aly Ngouille Ndiaye

See also
 Interior ministry
 Politics of Senegal

External links
List of former Ministers of the Interior

 
Ministers of the Interior